The Cabinet of Petr Fiala is the current government of the Czech Republic, appointed on 17 December 2021. Following elections in October 2021, President Miloš Zeman asked Petr Fiala, as the leader of the Spolu alliance, to form a new government. On 17 November 2021 Fiala presented Zeman with the names of his proposed cabinet, and Zeman agreed to appoint Fiala as the new Prime Minister on 28 November 2021.

Zeman met with all the ministerial nominees during the week following Fiala's appointment, expressing disagreement with the appointment of Jan Lipavský as foreign minister.

Government ministers 
The cabinet of Petr Fiala includes:

Seat distribution

Popular mandate 
Support for governing parties according to the popular vote.

Confidence motion

References 

Czech government cabinets
2021 establishments in the Czech Republic
Cabinets established in 2021
Civic Democratic Party (Czech Republic)
KDU-ČSL
TOP 09
Mayors and Independents
Czech Pirate Party
Coalition governments of the Czech Republic
Current governments
2021 Czech legislative election